There will be a quota of 70 athletes (40 men and 30 women). Each NOC is allowed to enter a maximum of 3 men and 3 women. The hosts Mexico is guaranteed 6 spots, either through qualifying or through a guaranteed host nation place. An athlete does not qualify through this system, rather he/she qualifies a spot for their nation, an athlete may not qualify more than 1 quota spot.

Qualification summary

Men
The following is a list of qualified athletes:

 Mexico qualified athletes through other routes, so its automatic spots have been given to other countries.
 Countries that are marked with a strike have withdrawn and there quota spot put in the wildcard pool.

Women
The following is a list of qualified athletes:

 Mexico qualified athletes through other routes, so its automatic spots have been given to other countries.

References 

P
Qualification for the 2011 Pan American Games